Dondi is a daily comic strip about a large-eyed war orphan of the same name. Created by Gus Edson and Irwin Hasen, it ran in more than 100 newspapers for three decades (September 25, 1955, to June 8, 1986).

Creation and publication history
Interviewed before a Comic-Con audience in San Diego, illustrator Hasen told TV-comics scripter Mark Evanier the origin of the strip during a trip to Korea:

After the death of Edson in 1966, Bob Oksner teamed with Hasen, whose first strip was dated April 23, 1967. Oksner and Hasen remained with the strip until its 1986 conclusion. When the strip ended, it was carried in only 35 newspapers.

Characters and story
Dondi's original backstory describes him as a five-year-old World War II orphan of Italian descent. The boy had no memory of his parents or his name, so when a pretty Red Cross worker said he was "a dandy boy," he thought she was naming him "Dondi." Two soldiers who spoke no Italian, Ted Wills and Whitey McGowan, found the child wandering through a war-torn village. The soldiers brought the child back to the United States and Ted eventually became his adoptive father.

Like other comic strip boys, such as Dennis in Dennis the Menace, Dondi's character never ages. This became problematic in later years, as Dondi's age made the origin story impossible. Eventually, references to his Italian origin ceased, and he was adopted by Ted and his wife, the former Katje Bogar. "Pop" Fligh, a former pro baseball player, became Dondi's adoptive grandfather when he married Ted Wills' widowed mother. Following this, Dondi was portrayed simply as an adopted child, although in the early 1960s there was a reference to his being an orphan of the Korean War. During the mid-1970s, there was a reference to his being from Vietnam.

A recurring character was Mrs. McGowan, who was the mother of Whitey McGowan. In a rather startling development for a comic strip at the time, Whitey and his new bride died in a car crash on their honeymoon, leaving Dondi to Mrs. McGowan, who had initially resented the boy, but came to love him and accept him as her grandson. This explanation was permitted to fade into the mists as the strip grew farther away from World War II.

Dondi was considered by some to be repellently wholesome; a Mad Magazine special issue in 1965 included a calendar that celebrated April 9 as "'Kick "Dondi" in the teeth day."  The Garden City Telegram (Garden City, Kansas) put it on its calendar, perhaps naïvely or as a joke (it was the April 1 issue).

Films
Dondi was adapted into a family-oriented film with David Kory in the title role and David Janssen as his American G.I. buddy, Dealey. Singer Patti Page also starred as Liz, and cameo appearances were made by Edson, as a police captain, and Hasen, as a police sketch artist. The movie (and especially Kory's performance) were negatively received by critics. Kory, the son of Rockette Diane Kory, had one minor TV role in 1963 and never made another film. Produced and directed by Albert Zugsmith, the film was released 26 March 1961.  Dondi was listed in the 1978 book The Fifty Worst Films of All Time.  

Zugsmith says Allied Artists made the film to show they could make movies for children. He says the studio "arbitrarily cut the wrong twenty minutes out of it."

A comic book adaptation of the movie was published as Four Color #1176 by Dell.

The comic strip is featured in a scene in Kenneth Anger's short film Scorpio Rising (1964).

Awards
Hasen received the National Cartoonists Society's Award for Story Comic Strip for 1961 and 1962 for his work on the strip.

References

External links

Syracuse University: Irwin Hasen Cartoons 1955-1968 
Syracuse University: Gus Edson Papers 1938-1966

1955 comics debuts
1986 comics endings
American comic strips
American comics adapted into films
Comic strips set in the United States
Comics about orphans
Drama comics
Works about adoption